In the Eastern Orthodox Church, akribeia is the strict adherence to the letter of the law of the Church.

Akribeia is to be distinguished from economy, which is discretionary deviation from the letter of the law in order to adhere to the spirit of the law.

Canon law 
In Eastern Orthodox canon law, there exists two notions: akriveia and economia. Akriveia, which is harshness, "is the strict application (sometimes even extension) of the penance given to an unrepentant and habitual offender." Economia, which is sweetness, "is a judicious relaxation of the penance when the sinner shows remorse and repentance."

See also
Antinomianism
Canon law of the Eastern Orthodox Church
Legalism (theology)
Oikonomia (leniency, opposite of akribeia)

References 

Canon law of the Eastern Orthodox Church